P.D.Q. Bach in Houston: We Have a Problem! is a live performance celebrating 40 years of P. D. Q. Bach. This performance features Professor Peter Schickele with Orchestra X conducted by Peter Jacoby. It includes never-before-recorded performances of "Trumpet Involuntary" movement of Iphigenia in Brooklyn, and also the rounds Odden und Enden (many of which have been previously unavailable on CD).

Performers

 Professor Peter Schickele, conductor, wine bottle, windbreaker, slide windbreaker, singist and musicological master
 Orchestra X, Peter Jacoby, conductor (on-screen credit: "semiconductor")
 Okay Chorale, Tom Jaber, chorusmaster (on-screen credit: "seasoned conductor")
 William “Bill” Walters, Manager of the Stage
 Gifford Nielsen, color commentator
 Michèle Eaton, singist
 David Düsing, singist
 Gerrod Pagenkopf, bargain counter tenor
 Jessica Smith, off-coloratura soprano
 Cybele Gouverneur, mezzanine-soprano
 John Weinel, tenor profundo
 Sam Handley, basso blotto
 Shih-Ting Huang, violin, captain of the orchestra
 Jaryn Philleo, oboe, double reeds
 Melanie Lancon, flute, slide whistle
 Marat Rakhmatullaev, bassoon, tromboon
 Cesar Martinez Bourguet, cello, discontinuo
 Larry Hernandez, trumpet
 Matt Menger, horn, shower hose in D
 Jacob Sustaita, viola
 Phil Moody, kazoo primo
 Brian Shircliffe, kazoo secundo
 John Welton, continuo accordiano
 Lillian Copeland, Ben Kamins, double reeds
 Patty Moeling, slide whistle
 Cheerleaders from the Spirit of Houston Cougar Band, themselves

Program
"Desecration of the House" Overture
Schleptet in E major, S. 0
Molto Larghissimo — Allegro Boffo
Menuetto con Brio ma Senza Trio
Adagio Saccharino
Yehudi Menuetto
Presto Hey Nonny Nonnio
Iphigenia in Brooklyn, S. 53,162
I. Trumpet Involuntary
II. Aria: "When Hyperion"
III. Recitative: "And Lo!"
IV. Ground: "Dying"
V. Recitative: "And in a vision"
VI. Aria: "Running"
"Unbegun" Symphony (Prof. Schickele)
III. Minuet
IV. Andante — Allegro
New Horizons in Music Appreciation
Allegro con brio from Symphony No. 5 in C minor (Beethoven)
Fuga Meshuga from The Musical Sacrifice, S. 50% off
The Seasonings, S. 1½ tsp.
Chorus: "Tarragon of virtue is full"
Recitative: "And there were in the same country"
Duet: "Bide thy thyme"
Fugue
Recitative: "Then asked he"
Chorale: "By the leeks of Babylon"
Recitative: "Then she gave in"
Aria: "Open sesame seeds"
Recitative: "So saying"
Duet: "Summer is a cumin seed"
Soloists and chorus: "To curry favor, favor curry"

DVD Bonus Selections
"Unbegun" Symphony with Theme Identifications
Odden und Enden
The Mule
Three-Step Crab Dinner
O Serpent
Johann Sebastian Bach (Prof. Schickele)
Please, Kind Sir, from The Art of the Ground Round
KUHT interview with Peter Schickele
Bio of Peter Schickele, P.D.Q. Bach and Peter Jacoby

Sources
 P.D.Q. Bach in Houston: We Have a Problem!

P. D. Q. Bach live albums
2006 video albums
Live video albums
2006 live albums
2000s comedy albums